Bad Religion is an American punk rock band from Los Angeles, California. Formed in 1980, the group originally included vocalist Greg Graffin, guitarist Brett Gurewitz, bassist Jay Bentley and drummer Jay Ziskrout. Ziskrout left the band halfway through the recording of their debut full-length album How Could Hell Be Any Worse? and was replaced for the rest of the sessions by Pete Finestone. 1983's Into the Unknown featured bassist Paul Dedona and Davy Goldman, both of whom left after the album was released. Bad Religion briefly broke up in 1984, as Gurewitz left the band to focus on his record label Epitaph Records and recording studio Westbeach Recorders, before returning with guitarist Greg Hetson, bassist Tim Gallegos and drummer Finestone for the 1985 EP Back to the Known.

Bentley and later Gurewitz returned to Bad Religion in 1986, with the five-piece lineup releasing three albums in three years before Finestone left again in 1991. He was replaced by Bobby Schayer, whose first album with the band was Generator in 1992. After Bad Religion signed to Atlantic Records and released Stranger than Fiction in 1994, Gurewitz left the band again. Shortly after the album's release, Brian Baker took Gurewitz's place in the group. After three more albums, Schayer departed the band in 2001 due to a shoulder injury, and was replaced by Brooks Wackerman. Around the same time, Gurewitz returned to the band for a third time. Longtime guitarist Hetson left in 2013 and was replaced by Mike Dimkich, and in 2016 Jamie Miller replaced Wackerman after he joined Avenged Sevenfold.

Members

Current

Former

Timeline

Lineups

References

External links
Bad Religion official website

Bad Religion